Rogue Star Films is an independent feature film company based in Cape Town, South Africa, owned by Ross Garland.

Rogue Star Films is the producer and distributor of Big Fellas, Confessions of a Gambler, and the film adaptation of the hit South African novel Spud.

Films
The Story of an African Farm 2004
U-Carmen eKhayelitsha 2005
Big Fellas 2007
Confessions of a Gambler 2008
Spud 2010
Spud 2: The Madness Continues 2013
Spud 3: Learning to Fly 2014

References

External links
Official website

Film production companies of South Africa
Companies based in Cape Town
Mass media in Cape Town